Nathaniel W. Pope (January 5, 1784 – January 23, 1850) was an American government leader in the early history of the State of Illinois. He served as the Secretary of the Illinois Territory, then as a Delegate to the United States House of Representatives from the Illinois Territory, and for over thirty years as the United States district judge for the United States District Court for the District of Illinois.

Early life and education

Born on January 5, 1784, in Louisville in what was then District of Kentucky, Virginia (but became Kentucky in his lifetime), to the former Penelope Sanford Edwards (1757-) and her husband Col. William H. Pope (1740-1825). Although the youngest boy in his family, Pope could trace his ancestors in Virginia back to around 1650 when Nathaniel Pope moved from strife-torn Maryland into what became called the Northern Neck of Virginia, as did Humphrey Pope and James Pope, probably his brothers. Both this man's parents had been born in Westmoreland County, Virginia, as had his grandfather Worden Pope (1705-1748) and great-grandfather Nathaniel Pope III (1660-1719, sometime called "Bridges" after another of his thrice-widowed mother's husbands), although his grandmother Hester Netherton Pope was born in what was then Stafford County, Virginia. Although the Pope family was well-established in Virginia, its members would only begin holding statewide office after the Revolutionary War, in which they supported the Patriot cause under the leadership of their neighbor, George Washington (whose distant ancestor John Washington had married the daughter of one of the earliest men named Nathaniel Pope. His eldest brother John Pope (1770-1845) was born in Prince William County, Virginia and would also become a lawyer and hold high political office, including in both houses of the Kentucky legislature as well as the U.S. Congress before becoming governor of the Arkansas Territory. Other brothers included William H. Pope Jr (1775-1844) who was born as the family continued moving westward into Fauquier County, Virginia, and Alexander Pope (1781-1826) and Nathaniel Pope (1784-1850), both of whom were born as the family moved to Louisville in what became the state of Kentucky when he was a boy. His birth family included several sisters who survived to adulthood and married including Penelope Edwards Oldham (1769-1821), Jane Pope Field (1772-1852; also born in Fauquier County) and Hester Pope Edwards (1788-1868; born in Louisville). After a private education appropriate to his class, Nathaniel Pope attended Transylvania University, then read law in 1804.

Early career

Admitted to the bar, Nathaniel Pope entered private practice in Ste. Genevieve, Louisiana Territory (now Missouri) and across the Mississippi River in Kaskaskia, Indiana Territory (that became Illinois Territory from March 1, 1809) from 1804 to 1809. When the Illinois Territory was created President James Madison appointed Kentucky politician John Boyle as the Territorial Governor and Pope as the Territorial Secretary. Although Boyle resigned after three weeks (in order to become Kentucky's Chief Justice) and was succeeded by Ninian Edwards (a lawyer and Maryland politician who was related to Pope's mother and had moved to Kentucky and now the Illinois Territory), Nathaniel Pope served from 1809 to 1816. He was acting Governor of the Illinois Territory in 1809. He was an Illinois Territorial Militia officer in 1812. Pope was a Democratic-Republican

Congressional service

Pope was elected on September 5, 1816, as a Delegate to the United States House of Representatives for a term of two years, serving in the 15th United States Congress from March 4, 1817 to November 30, 1818. He was a register for the United States Land Office in Edwardsville, Illinois Territory (State of Illinois from December 3, 1818) from November 30, 1818 to March 3, 1819.

Notable legislation

Pope was instrumental both in securing the new territory's admission as the 21st State on December 3, 1818 (the statehood resolution passed regardless of the creative counting to achieve the former minimum of 60,000 persons) as well as in adjusting the new state's northern boundary from the southern extremity of Lake Michigan extending it north to the 42° 30' parallel. Adding the land now included in the thirteen northern counties became very important for Illinois' development, because it included what was to become its largest city (Chicago), although it also slowed Wisconsin's qualification for admission to the Union. Furthermore, Pope drafted the statehood resolution to ensure that 2% of land sales would be used to fund roads and 3% to fund schools, unlike the previous statehood resolutions which required 5% to be used to fund roads.

Federal judicial service

Pope was nominated by President James Monroe on March 3, 1819, to the United States District Court for the District of Illinois, to a new seat authorized by 3 Stat. 502. He was confirmed by the United States Senate on March 3, 1819, and received his commission the same day. His service terminated on January 23, 1850, due to his death in St. Louis, Missouri. He was interred in the Colonel O’Fallon Burying Ground and later reinterred at the Bellefontaine Cemetery in St. Louis.

Unsuccessful campaign

Pope was an unsuccessful candidate for election to the United States Senate in 1824.

Honor

Pope County, Illinois, was named for Pope, as was the recently closed Nathaniel Pope Elementary School in North Lawndale, Chicago, Illinois.

References

Sources
 "Nathaniel Pope:From Connections and Factional Politics to Champion of Statehood" from Illinois History, December 1993

Further reading
 Angle, Paul M. McClelland. Nathaniel Pope from 1784 to 1850, A Memoir. [Springfield, Ill.]: Privately printed, 1937. 
 Bloom, Jo Tice. "Peaceful Politics: The Delegates from Illinois Territory from 1809 to 1818." The Old Northwest 6 (Fall 1980): 203-15.
 Illinois (Ter.) Laws, Statutes, etc. Laws of the Territory of Illinois, revised and digested, under the authority of the legislature. By Nathaniel Pope. Kaskaskia: Printed by Matthew Duncan Printer to the Territory, 1815.

External links

 

|-

|-

|-

1784 births
1850 deaths
19th-century American judges
19th-century American politicians
Delegates to the United States House of Representatives from Illinois Territory
Illinois Democratic-Republicans
Judges of the United States District Court for the District of Illinois
People from Edwardsville, Illinois
People from Kaskaskia, Illinois
Politicians from Louisville, Kentucky
Transylvania University alumni
United States federal judges admitted to the practice of law by reading law
United States federal judges appointed by James Monroe